The Albert system refers to a system of clarinet keywork and fingering developed by Eugène Albert. In the United Kingdom it is known as the simple system.  It has been largely replaced by the Boehm system and Oehler system.

Big Band musician Jimmy Dorsey used a clarinet outfitted with the Albert system.

The Albert system is still used, mainly by clarinettists who perform Belarusian, Russian, Ukrainian, Greek and Turkish folk music, Klezmer, and Dixieland styles. Often these musicians prefer the Albert system due to the ease of slurring notes provided by unkeyed tone holes. 

The system is a derivative of the early 19th century 13-key system developed by Iwan Müller and as such is related to the (more advanced) Oehler system used by most German and Austrian clarinettists.

External links
Albert System: The Jazz Clarinet (Archived 2012-02-28)

Clarinet systems